Abul Fazal (1 July 1903–4 May 1983) was a  Bangladeshi writer and academic. He served as the 4th vice-chancellor of University of Chittagong. He was awarded Bangla Academy Literary Award in 1962 and Independence Day Award  in 2012 (posthumously).

Early life and education
Fazal was born at Satkania Upazila in Chittagong District in 1903 to Moulvi Fazlur Rahman, an Imam of Chittagong Jame Masjid. Fazal earned B.A. from the University of Dhaka. He passed M.A. in Bengali language and literature from Calcutta University in 1940.

Career 
Fazal began his career as an Imam. He taught in multiple schools as a teacher. In 1941, he became a professor of Krishnanagar College and later of Chittagong College. He served as the vice-chancellor of the University of Chittagong from 1973 to 1975.

Fazal served as a member in charge of education and culture of the advisory council of the Government of Bangladesh during 1975–23 June 1977.

Works
Fazal wrote in a variety of genres: novels, short stories, plays, memoirs, travels etc. He also wrote about religion. Some of his writings include Matir Prthibi (1940), Bichitra Katha (1940), Rekhachitra (1966) and Durdiner Dinlipi (1972).

Novels
 Chouchir (Splintered, 1934)
 Prodip O Patongo (Torch and Insects, 1940)
 Ranga Probhat (The Crimson Dawn, 1957)
 Khuda O Asha (Hunger and Hope, 1964).

Awards
 Bangla Academy Literary Award (1962)
 President's National Award (1966)
 Adamjee Literary Award (1966)
 Honorary Doctorate from the University of Dhaka (1974)
 The Nasiruddin Gold Medal (1980)
 The Muktadhara Literary Award (1981)
 The Abdul Hai Literary Award (1982)
 Independence Day Award (2012)

References

1903 births
1983 deaths
Bangladeshi male writers
Bengali writers
Bengali-language writers
Recipients of Bangla Academy Award
Recipients of the Independence Day Award
Vice-Chancellors of the University of Chittagong
Recipients of the Adamjee Literary Award
People from Satkania Upazila
People from Chittagong District